The Polish Children's Fund (KFnrD) is a Polish non-government organization which supports highly gifted schoolchildren. It was established in 1981 by Ryszard Rakowski and late Jan Szczepański.

The Polish Children's Fund organizes the national stage of the European Union Contest for Young Scientists.

Scholarship programme

The Polish Children's Fund gives scholarships for pre-university students skilled in the sciences, humanities, musics or ballet. Every year around 550 children receive the scholarship. Instead of financial aid, KFnrD gives its participants unique opportunities to participate in lectures, workshops and research projects in cooperation with some of the most eminent scholars both from Poland and other European countries.

Most of the scientific camps are devoted to a single discipline and have its further qualification. They are organized by various institutions of the University of Warsaw, the Polish Academy of Sciences, Jagiellonian University and the Nicolaus Copernicus University in Toruń.

One of the central events is a general camp, which takes place in Serock (near Warsaw) from April to June (previous locations included Otwock and Jadwisin). The participants have opportunity to attend lectures and workshops related to their interests. Also, they take part in the activities not connected with any particular field of study: sport games, psychological workshops, movie projections, concerts, and meetings with intellectuals, often pertaining to profound themes of philosophy, religion and developing one's worldview.

During the summer the Polish Children's Fund scholars are sent to various scientific camps, including:
 Research Science Institute - a highly competitive research camp which takes place at the Massachusetts Institute of Technology,
 European Space Camp - astronomic camp in Lofoten, Norway,
 XLAB International Science Camp  at the University of Göttingen,
 London International Youth Science Forum.

In 2014, Polish Children's Fund together with University of Warsaw and Copernicus Science Centre organises EUCYS finals, which are being held in Warsaw.

See also
 Gifted education
 List of gifted and talented programmes

External links
 fundusz.org - Polish Children's Fund - Non-profit NGO
  Krajowy Fundusz na rzecz Dzieci
  How does Fund work? A short video
 An independent camp for high school geeks (31 August 2012) - an article on gifted education using Polish Children's Fund as a reference

References

 
 
 
 

Gifted education
Polish educational societies